Derry Township is a township in Dauphin County, Pennsylvania, United States. The population was 24,796 at the 2020 census, an increase over the figure of 24,679 tabulated in 2010. Hershey, the site of the well-known Hershey's chocolate factory and its affiliated amusement park, is located within the township. Pennsylvania State University's Milton S. Hershey Medical Center and the Penn State Hershey Children's Hospital are also located on a large tract of land in the township.

History
The Township of Derry was incorporated on August 1, 1729, when Lancaster County partitioned its territory for tax purposes. At that time, the boundaries of Derry Township were much larger and included what are currently three other townships within Lancaster and Dauphin counties.

The first official government in Derry Township was established in 1759. Five officials were elected for one-year terms. The number of elected officials in Derry remains five, although the terms are now six years.

In 1767 the court ordered the division of Derry Township, the eastern section to remain Derry and the western to be Londonderry Township.

Derry and Londonderry became a part of Dauphin County when it was established in 1785. In 1787, the township's population was 198. Conewago Township was created in 1850 from southern parts of Derry Township and eastern parts of Londonderry Township.

The Derry Session House and Enclosure and Quarries of the Hummelstown Brownstone Company are listed on the National Register of Historic Places.

Geography
Derry Township is located in southeastern Dauphin County, bordered to the east by Lebanon County. Swatara Creek forms the northwest border of the township, except where the border is with the borough of Hummelstown. The unincorporated community of Hershey occupies the center, northern, and much of the eastern part of the township, and Palmdale is in the northeastern part of the township. Both Hershey and Palmdale are census-designated places (CDPs). Swatara and Hockersville are unincorporated communities within the western and southern parts, respectively, of the Hershey CDP. Oakmont is near the intersection of Waltonville and Wood Roads, Waltonville is in the southern part of the township, and Clifton is partially in the southwest corner.
 
Derry has a hot-summer humid continental climate (Dfa) and the hardiness zones are 6b and 7a. Average monthly temperatures in Hershey range from 30.1 °F in January to 74.8 °F in July.

Demographics

As of the census of 2000, there were 21,273 people, 8,861 households, and 5,688 families residing in the township.  The population density was 784.0 people per square mile (302.7/km2).  There were 9,481 housing units at an average density of 349.4/sq mi (134.9/km2).  The racial makeup of the township was 92.65% White, 1.67% African American, 0.07% Native American, 3.96% Asian, 0.02% Pacific Islander, 0.43% from other races, and 1.19% from two or more races. Hispanic or Latino of any race were 1.40% of the population.

There were 8,861 households, out of which 28.5% had children under the age of 18 living with them, 54.6% were married couples living together, 7.0% had a female householder with no husband present, and 35.8% were non-families. 30.4% of all households were made up of individuals, and 12.6% had someone living alone who was 65 years of age or older.  The average household size was 2.32 and the average family size was 2.92.

In the township the population was spread out, with 22.9% under the age of 18, 6.3% from 18 to 24, 28.9% from 25 to 44, 23.5% from 45 to 64, and 18.4% who were 65 years of age or older.  The median age was 40 years. For every 100 females, there were 89.6 males.  For every 100 females age 18 and over, there were 85.6 males.

The median income for a household in the township was $52,290, and the median income for a family was $68,838. Males had a median income of $48,510 versus $32,430 for females. The per capita income for the township was $31,365.  About 2.8% of families and 4.7% of the population were below the poverty line, including 4.1% of those under age 18 and 4.2% of those age 65 or over.

Government
Derry Township has its own public works department; public library, the Hershey Public Library; and its own police force, the Derry Township Police Department. Derry Township is also home to Hershey Entertainment and Resorts Company (HERCO) which owns Hersheypark and other tourist attractions.

Notable people
Milton S. Hershey, founder of The Hershey Company and the town of Hershey
H.B. Reese, inventor of Reese's Peanut Butter Cups

References

External links

Derry Township official website

Hershey, Pennsylvania
Townships in Dauphin County, Pennsylvania